The 1930 Macdonald Brier, the Canadian men's national curling championship, was held from February 25 to 28, 1930 at the Granite Club in Toronto, Ontario.

Alberta and Manitoba both finished round robin play with 7-2 records necessitating a tiebreaker playoff to determine the Brier champion. In the playoff, Team Manitoba, who was skipped by Howard "Pappy" Wood, Sr. would defeat Alberta 12–9 to capture Manitoba's third straight Brier Tankard. Howard's brothers, Vic and Lionel became the first siblings to win the Brier.

Teams
The teams are listed as follows:

Round Robin standings

Round Robin results

Draw 1

Draw 2

Draw 3

Draw 4

Draw 5

Draw 6

Draw 7

Draw 8

Draw 9

Tiebreaker

References 

Macdonald Brier, 1930
Macdonald Brier, 1930
The Brier
Curling in Toronto
Macdonald Brier
Macdonald Brier
February 1930 events in North America
1930s in Toronto